Grajaú is a train station on ViaMobilidade Line 9-Emerald, in the district of Grajaú in São Paulo.

History
Grajaú station was opened by FEPASA in 1992, to attend the district of Grajaú, as part of the Jurubatuba-Varginha operational extension. Initially it was composed of two wood platforms, built along with a pontillion which crossed over Avenida Belmira Marin. The old station was deactivated in December 2001, along with the traffic of Jurubatuba-Varginha branch, and was demolished by CPTM for the construction of Line 9-Emerald above the old FEPASA South Line.

In 2008, a larger and modernized new station was built by CPTM in the same place of the old one and kept the name Grajaú, with free access to the SPTrans urban bus terminal.

See also
 Grajaú (district of São Paulo)
 Line 9 (CPTM)
 Subprefecture of Capela do Socorro

Reference

External links
 Official page of the Paulista Metropolitan Trains Company
 Subprefecture of Capela do Socorro
 Roman Catholic Diocese of Santo Amaro

Railway stations opened in 1996
Railway stations opened in 2008